Nikolay Fyodorovich Korolyov (14 March 1917, Moscow – 12 March 1974, Moscow) was a Soviet boxer and trainer. Korolyov was the nine time heavyweight champion of the USSR.

Biography 

Born in Moscow in 1917, Korolyov began working at the Neftegaz factory there after graduating from school.

He began his route towards major sporting success in 1933, under the leadership of Ivan Stepanovich Bogayev - one of the pioneers of Soviet boxing. Soon Korolyov entered the Stalin Technical School of Physical Culture and began to train, first under  and then under Arkady Georgievich Kharlampiyev, father of Anatoly Kharlampiyev.

On 22 October 1936, at the Moscow Circus on Tsvetnoy Boulevard, Korolyov first became the Absolute Champion of the USSR. Korolyov's opponent was the very strong and experienced . After six three-minute rounds, Korolyov became the foremost pugilist in the Soviet Union. In 1937 he triumphed at the Workers' Olympiad in Antwerp, knocking out two opponents in the first round.

Korolyov graduated as a trainer, receiving one of the first such diplomas in the Soviet Union.

In 1939 Korolyov was called up for military service. He became a student at a school for fighter pilots. However, because of a plane accident in which he received heavy injuries, Korolyov was forced to leave military service.

During World War II Korolyov served in the detachment of Hero of the Soviet Union Colonel Dmitry Medvedev. He twice carried an injured Medvedev from the battlefield. After the war Korolyov served in the Northern Fleet for more than a decade.

In 1944 Korolyov returned to the ring. In a difficult bout with Yevgeny Ogurenkov he regained the title of Absolute Champion of the Soviet Union, and in 1945 repeated this achievement. In 1946 Korolyov won international tournaments in Helsinki and Prague.

Korolyov died on 12 March 1974, two days shy of his 57th birthday, and was buried in the Vvedenskoye Cemetery in Moscow.

Sporting achievements

Won 206 out of 219 matches, with 19 matches in international bouts
9 time heavyweight champion of the USSR (1936–1953)
4 time absolute champion of the USSR (1936–1937 and 1944–1945)
Winner of the 1937 Workers' Olympiad in Antwerp
Winner of international tournaments in Helsinki and Prague (1946)

Awards
Order of the Red Banner
Order of the Red Banner of Labour
Medal "To a Partisan of the Patriotic War", 1st class
Merited Master of Sport of the USSR (1942)

Memorials
In Bryansk an International (formerly All-Union) boxing memorial tournament was created in the name of Korolyov. The first tournament was held in 1974, and after a hiatus from 1985 they resumed in 2002.
In 1977 the Soviet Ministry of Communications issued an illustrated envelope to mark 60 years since the birth of Korolyov.

References

External links
Article about Korolyov from East Side Boxing
Personal website Nikolay Korolyov

1917 births
1974 deaths
Martial artists from Moscow
Communist Party of the Soviet Union members
Honoured Masters of Sport of the USSR
Recipients of the Order of the Red Banner
Recipients of the Order of the Red Banner of Labour
Russian male boxers
Soviet male boxers
Soviet partisans
Burials at Vvedenskoye Cemetery